Karabulut is a Turkish proper noun  (meaning "black cloud") and may refer to:

Places 
 Karabulut, Akşehir
 Karabulut, Edirne
 Karabulut, Mazgirt

Surnames 
 Arzu Karabulut (born 1991), Turkish-German women's footballer
 Aydın Karabulut (born 1988), Turkish-German footballer
 Özkan Karabulut (born 1991), Turkish footballer
 Sadet Karabulut (born 1975), Dutch politician of Kurdish-Turkish descent

Turkish-language surnames